The 1996 United States Senate election in New Hampshire was held on November 5, 1996. Incumbent Republican U.S. Senator Bob Smith won re-election to a second term. Smith had established himself as the most conservative Senator from the Northeast, and Bill Clinton's coattails nearly caused his defeat. That was to the point that on the night of the election many American media networks incorrectly projected that Dick Swett had won.

General election

Candidates
 Ken Blevens (Libertarian)
 Bob Smith, incumbent U.S. Senator (Republican)
 Dick Swett, former U.S. Representative (Democratic)

Results

See also 
 1996 United States Senate elections

References 

New Hampshire
1996
1996 New Hampshire elections